The A79 autoroute (La Bourbonnaise) is a motorway in central France. Opened in November 2022, it connects the A71 autoroute near Sazeret with Moulins and Digoin. It is being extended to the A6 autoroute near Mâcon, which is expected to be completed in 2023. The A79 is an upgrade of the Route nationale 79 to motorway standards.

A79 was also the code for a projected motorway between the A432 autoroute (Lyon-Saint-Exupéry Airport) to A9 autoroute/A61 autoroute (Narbonne) via Valence, Aubenas and Alès. A public inquiry into "Transport in the Rhone Valley and Languedoc Coast" was held between 27 March and 26 July 2006. This new road would avoid the widening of the A7 autoroute to 2×5 lanes between Lyon/Valence and Orange and would offer a credible alternative for traffic to the Rhone Valley.  It would serve a host of new communities in several departments (Ardèche, Haute Gard, Haute Vallée de Hérault) would be served: Privas, Aubenas, Alès, Le Vigan. The cost estimated in 2005 was 3.4 billion euros (as a comparison, the widening of the A7 and A9 would cost 1.5 billion euros).

References

A79